Nawabzada Shahzain Bugti is a Pakistani politician who has been a member of the National Assembly of Pakistan since August 2018. He served as Special Assistant to Prime Minister on Reconciliation and Harmony in Balochistan from 7 July 2021 to 27 March 2022.

Political career
He was elected to the National Assembly of Pakistan from Constituency NA-259 as a candidate of  Jamhoori Wattan Party in 2018 Pakistani general election. During No Confidence Vote 2022, he sided with the then opposition to oust Prime Minister Imran Khan.

References

External links
 

Living people
Pakistani MNAs 2018–2023
Nawabzada Shahzain
Jamhoori Wattan Party politicians
Year of birth missing (living people)